Mallosia scovitzii is a species of beetle in the family Cerambycidae. It is found in Armenia, Azerbaijan, Georgia, Turkey, and Iran.

Mallosia scovitzii measure  in length. Its host plants are Ferula and Prangos (family Apiaceae).

References

Saperdini
Beetles of Asia
Beetles described in 1837